Andreas Cederholm (born 4 May 1990) is a Swedish handball player for IFK Kristianstad and the Swedish national team.

He competed at the 2016 European Men's Handball Championship.

References

1990 births
Living people
Swedish male handball players
IFK Kristianstad players
Expatriate handball players
Swedish expatriate sportspeople in France
Swedish expatriate sportspeople in Germany
Handball-Bundesliga players
People from Hjo Municipality
Sportspeople from Västra Götaland County